Christian Wieczorek (born December 9, 1985) is a German retired footballer who played as a midfielder for FC Vaduz in the Swiss Super League.

Club career 
Wieczorek started his career at VfL Schildesche. In 1999, he joined Arminia Bielefeld's youth team. After 6 years, he left Arminia Bielefeld and moved to FC Vaduz and played 48 games, scoring 4 goals. In December 2008 his career finished, following injury (a cranial fracture the previous April).

Managerial career 
Wieczorek will begin to work as Head Coach in Bielefeld.

References

External links
 

1985 births
Living people
German footballers
Swiss Super League players
FC Vaduz players
German expatriate sportspeople in Liechtenstein
Expatriate footballers in Liechtenstein
Arminia Bielefeld players
Sportspeople from Bielefeld
Association football midfielders
Footballers from North Rhine-Westphalia
German expatriate footballers